

The Mercury Kitten (also known as the Aerial Kitten) was an American three-seat cabin monoplane designed and built by Mercury Aircraft Inc. in the late 1920s. Flown for the first time in 1928 only one was built.

Design
The Kitten was a three-seat high wing cabin monoplane powered by a  Mummert piston engine. It was constructed with welded steel tubing with fabric covering. It was later re-engined with a  Warner Scarab engine. The Kitten was scrapped in 1946.

Specifications

External links
Link to image of a Mercury Kitten
General Aviation News 2012 April 25, "Flying on wings of mercury"

References

Notes

Bibliography

1920s United States civil utility aircraft
High-wing aircraft
Aircraft first flown in 1928